The Pig and Whistle was a Canadian musical television series aired on the CTV television network from 1967 to 1977. Filmed in Toronto, Ontario but set in a fictional English pub, the show featured an assortment of Canadian, British and Irish performers.

One of CTV's most popular programs of its day, The Pig and Whistle drew ratings of over a million viewers in the early 1970s. The programme was hosted by John Hewer and featured the music of the Carlton Showband, a Canadian-Irish musical group. Scottish singer and entertainer Stan Kane was often featured.

The programme's title is derived from one of the names of a traditional English public house, whose meaning in turn remains somewhat speculative.

References

External links

Jam!: Carlton Showband (the programme's regular music group)
TVArchive.ca: The Pig and Whistle
Canadian Communications Foundation: Pig and Whistle
CTV Toronto: CFTO historical reference
Museum of Broadcast Communications: Canadian Television Programming in English

1960s Canadian variety television series
CTV Television Network original programming
1967 Canadian television series debuts
1977 Canadian television series endings
1970s Canadian variety television series